Plagiognathops microlepis, the smallscale yellowfin, is a species of cyprinid fish found in China and Russia.  It is the only member of its genus.

References 
Sources
 
Citations

Xenocyprinae
Cyprinid fish of Asia
Freshwater fish of China
Fish of Russia
Fish described in 1871